Saint Patroclus of Bourges  (c. 496–576) was a Merovingian ascetic, who was a native of the province of Berry, France. In his Historia Francorum, Gregory of Tours writes that Patroclus became a deacon at Bourges in his youth. He would drink nothing stronger than water that had been sweetened with honey. He ate only bread, water, and salt, and devoted long periods to prayer, being credited with healing powers. He died aged eighty years old.

References

External links

 Church Calendar: November

6th-century Christian clergy
6th-century Frankish saints
496 births
576 deaths